Pricetown is an unincorporated community in eastern Salem Township, Highland County, Ohio, United States.

History
It was platted by Elijah, David and Jane Faris, along with Alexander Murphy on April 13, 1847 and named for Common Pleas Judge J.W. Price of Hillsboro. Its mail service is from Lynchburg.  The community is on State Route 131 near the headwaters of the Oak Creek.

Gallery

Notable person
 Charles C. Gossett, 20th Governor of Idaho and United States Senator from Idaho

References

Unincorporated communities in Highland County, Ohio
Populated places established in 1847
1847 establishments in Ohio
Unincorporated communities in Ohio